The Cartier Women's Initiative, created in 2006, are a joint partnership project initiated by Cartier, the Women's Forum, McKinsey & Company and INSEAD business school to encourage women entrepreneurs.

Process
Seven laureates (formerly six), one from each continental region (East Asia, South Asia & Oceania, Europe, Latin America, Middle East and North Africa, North America, Sub-saharan Africa) are honoured annually for the creativity, financial sustainability and social impact of their start-up businesses.

The prize includes a place on an INSEAD executive programme, a US$100,000 grant (before 2017, $20,000), international media exposure and networking and coaching opportunities.

History of the awards
In 2006, Cartier supported the very first edition of the Women's Forum for the Economy and Society, an international gathering designed to promote women's vision on issues of global relevance.

In 2006, Cartier and the Women's Forum joined forces with McKinsey & Company and INSEAD business school to create the Cartier Women's Initiative Awards that aim to support female entrepreneurs through mentoring, funding, networking opportunities and media visibility.

The very first Laureates were awarded in 2007. Since the creation of the Award, 32 entrepreneurs have received the Cartier Women's Initiative Awards.

Competition
Phase I - Three finalists from each of the seven regions (Latin America, North America, Europe, sub-Saharan Africa, Middle East and North Africa, East Asia and South Asia & Oceania) are selected in the first round of the competition. These 21 finalists receive coaching to move to the next phase where they submit a detailed business plan and defend their projects verbally in front of the jury.

Phase II - The 21 finalists are invited to attend the Awards Week and the seven laureates are nominated during the Awards Ceremony which up until 2015, was traditionally held at the Annual Global Meeting of the Women's Forum in Deauville.

The finalists and laureates are selected by regional juries composed of entrepreneurs, economists, business men and women, entrepreneurship advocates etc. They are chosen on the basis of their entrepreneurial experience, their business achievements and their commitment to the support of women entrepreneurs. The jury's involvement is long-term and voluntary.

The coaching of the finalists and laureates is conducted by Cartier managers, McKinsey & Company consultants, INSEAD alumni and INSEAD MBA students.

Women of any nationality, sector of industry and country may apply.

Past laureates

2019

 Latin America, Liza Velarde, Mexico.  Delee - A blood test that detects the presence of circulating tumour cells (CTCs) in cancer patients, enabling physicians to better monitor progress of the disease.
 North America, Ran Ma, United States.  Siren - Smart socks for diabetics made of Neurofabric, a proprietary technology fitted with micro-sensors to monitor foot temperature and guard against foot ulcers.
 Europe, Zineb Agoumi, France.  EzyGain - An affordable space-saving and connected gait rehabilitation device that secures patients at the pelvis and monitors their progress.
 Sub-Saharan Africa, Manka Angwafo, Cameroon.  Grassland Cameroon Ltd. - Services to enhance African food supply chains through affordable asset-based financing to smallholder farmers.
 Middle-East and North Africa, Hibah Shata, UAE.  Maharat Learning Center - A learning centre offering behavioural therapy and educational support to children and young adults with special needs.
 East Asia, Yeon Jeong Cho, South Korea.  SAY Global – An online language service that trains retired seniors in Korea and connects them to Korean language learners worldwide.
 South Asia & Oceania, Carmina Bayombong, Philippines.  InvestEd – An investment platform providing student loans to underserved youth using a proprietary credit rating algorithm.

2018

 Latin America, Paula Gomez, Brazil.  Epistimic - device giving warning of epileptic seizure.
 North America, Yiding Yu, United States.  Twiage - digital platform that enables the transmission of real-time data from ambulance to hospital.
 Europe, Kristina Tsvetanova, Austria.  Blitab Technology - tactile tablet for the visually impaired.
 Sub-Saharan Africa, Siroun Shamigan, Lebanon.  Kamkalima - online AI system that teaches Arabic.
 Middle-East and North Africa, Melissa Bime, Cameroon.  Infiuss - online blood bank that intermediates between hospitals.
 Aisia-Pacific, Swati Pandey, India.  Arboreal Agro Innovations – industrial scale, vertically-integrated stevia producer.

2017

 Latin America, Candice Pascoal, Brazil. Kikante, crowdfunding platform.
 North America, Katie Anderson, US.  Save Water & Co, data analytics to reduce water consumption.
 Europe, Ciara Donlon, Ireland.  Theya Healthcare post surgery bamboo undergarments.
 Sub-Saharan Africa, Salma Abdulai, Ghana. Unique Quality Product enabling fonio farming and processing.
 Middle-East and North Africa, Sara-Kristina Hannig Nour, Egypt.  Sara and Lara's Baskets delivers weekly baskets of organic products in Egyprian cities.
 Aisia-Pacific, Trupti Jain, India.  Naireeta Services water management solutions for small farmers.

2016

2015

 Asia & Pacific: Hannah Chou and Momo Huang , OurCityLove Social Entreprise, Taiwan
 Europe: Ciara Clancy, Beats Medical, Ireland
 Latin America: Komal Dadlani, Lab4U, Chile
 Middle East and North Africa: Mouna Abbassy, Izil Beauty, UAE
 North America: Alexandra Greenhill, myBestHelper, Canada
 Sub-Saharan Africa: Chinwe Ohajuruka, Comprehensive Design Services, Nigeria

2014

 Asia & Pacific: Diana Jue and Jackie Stenson, Essmart Global, India
 Europe: Carla Delfino, Imperial Europe, Italy
 Latin America: Bel Pesce, FazINOVA, Brazil
 Middle East and North Africa: Mariam Hazem, Reform Studio, Egypt
 North America: Eleni Antoniadou, Transplants Without Donors, United States
 Sub-Saharan Africa: Achenyo Idachaba, MitiMeth, Nigeria

2013

 Asia & Pacific: Namita Banka, Banka Bioloo, India
 Europe: Leonora O'Brien, Pharmapod, Ireland
 Latin America: Gabriela Maldonado, Jugando Aprendo, Guatemala
 Middle East and North Africa: Sima Najjar, Ekeif.com, Jordan
 North America: Priyanka Bakaya, PK Clean, United States
 Sub-Saharan Africa: Bilikiss Adebiyi, Wecyclers, Nigeria

2012

 Asia & Pacific: Lianna Gunawan, La Spina Collections, Indonesia
 Europe: Cécile Réal, Endodiag, France
 Latin America: Gabriela Flores, Kirah Design, Bolivia
 Middle East and North Africa: Iba Masood, Gradberry.com, United Arab Emirates
 North America: Ting Shih, ClickMedix, United States
 Sub-Saharan Africa: Julienne Ingabire & Elizabeth Scharpf, Sustainable Health Enterprises, Rwanda

2011

 Asia & Pacific: Chunhong Chen, Yiyuan Environmental Group, China
 Europe: Kresse Wesling, Elvis & Kresse, United Kingdom
 Latin America: Carolina Guerra, Ingerecuperar, Colombia
 Middle East and North Africa: Rana El Chemaitelly, The Little Engineer, Lebanon
 North America: Benita Singh and Summer Rayne Oakes, Source4Style, United States
 Sub-Saharan Africa: Lorna Rutto, EcoPost, Kenya

2010

 Africa: Ann Kihengu, Prian, Tanzania
 Asia: Gouthami, Travel Another India, India
 Europe: Wendy McMillan, Who to Ask?, United Kingdom
 Latin America: Valentina Peroni, Nutribaby, Argentina
 North America: Birame Sock, Third Solutions, United States

2009

 Africa: Jife Williams and Adeola Asabia, MN Environmental Services, Nigeria
 Asia: Kimberley Ong, AlgaVentures, Philippines
 Europe: Kristin Pétursdóttir and Halla Tómasdóttir, Audur Capital, Iceland
 Latin America: Rosario Monteverde and Magdalena Rodríguez, PRO Internacional, Uruguay
 North America: Una Ryan, Waltham Technologies, United States

2008

 Africa: Mame Diene, Karistal, Senegal
 Asia: Renee King, Tamang Timpla Food Inc., Philippines
 Europe: Laura Chicurel, Chicurela, United Kingdom
 Latin America: Cynthia Guy, Instituto de Implantes Cocleares, Panama
 North America: Mona S. Jhaveri, Foligo Therapeutics, United States

2007

 Africa: Lucie Avoaka, Santa Maria Medical Center, Côte d'Ivoire
 Asia: Nandini Pandhi and Yasmina McCarty, GreenMango, India
 Europe: Bettina Götzenberger, Lomaslegal, Spain
 Latin America: Antonia Sanin, The Globe, Colombia
 North America: Angel Chang, Angel Chang LLC, United States

References

External links
 Cartier Women's Initiative Awards
 Article on aufeminin.com 

Business and industry awards
Cartier
Awards established in 2006